The 1955 Central Michigan Chippewas football team represented Central Michigan College, renamed Central Michigan University in 1959, in the Interstate Intercollegiate Athletic Conference (IIAC) during the 1955 college football season. In their fifth season under head coach Kenneth Kelly, the Chippewas compiled an 8–1 record (5–1 against IIAC opponents), tied for the IIAC championship shut out three of nine opponents, and outscored all opponents by a combined total of 327 to 79.

The team's statistical leaders included Mike Sweeney with 302 passing yards, Bernie Raterink with 1,044 rushing yards, and Ray Sine with 140 receiving yards. Raterink received the team's most valuable player award. Four Central Michigan players (Raterink, guard Ray Figg, center Dick Kackmeister, and end Jarv Walz) received first-team honors on the All-IIAC team. Raterink was also named most valuable player in the IIAC.

Schedule

References

Central Michigan
Central Michigan Chippewas football seasons
Interstate Intercollegiate Athletic Conference football champion seasons
Central Michigan Chippewas football